Environmental Sciences Europe is a peer-reviewed scientific journal covering all aspects of environmental science. It was established in 1989 as Umweltwissenschaften und Schadstoff-Forschung (German for Environmental Science and Pollution Research), obtaining its current name in 2011. It is published by Springer Science+Business Media and the editor-in-chief is Henner Hollert (RWTH Aachen University). Since 2011, the journal has been open access.

Abstracting and indexing 
The journal is abstracted and indexed in:

According to the Journal Citation Reports, the journal has a 2021 impact factor of 5.481, ranking it 79th out of 279 journals in the category "Environmental Sciences".

Controversies
In June 2014 ESE republished the retracted paper in question in the Séralini affair, which had been originally published in Food and Chemical Toxicology in September 2012 and then retracted in November 2013.

References

External links 
 

Springer Science+Business Media academic journals
Publications established in 1989
Environmental science journals
English-language journals
Creative Commons Attribution-licensed journals
Open access journals